Imran Chakravarthy, also known mononymously as Johnny, is an Indian actor and son of S. S. Chakravarthy. He debuted in Renigunta alongside Sanusha. It was produced by his father's banner, NIC Arts. He worked again with his debut film director, R. Panneerselvam for his next film 18 Vayasu alongside Gayathrie Shankar.

He was to act in director Shiva Gnanam's Deal, but the cast and crew later changed.

Filmography

External links

References

Indian male film actors
Tamil male actors
Living people
21st-century Indian actors
1990 births